Begomovirus is a genus of viruses, in the family Geminiviridae. They are plant viruses that as a group have a very wide host range, infecting dicotyledonous plants. Worldwide they are responsible for a considerable amount of economic damage to many important crops such as tomatoes, beans, squash, cassava and cotton. There are 445 species in this genus.

Morphology
Virus particles are non-enveloped. The nucleocapsid is 38 nanometers (nm) long and 15–22 nm in diameter. While particles have basic icosahedral symmetry, they consist of two incomplete icosahedra—missing one vertex—joined together. There are 22 capsomeres per nucleocapsid.

Genome
Single stranded closed circular DNA. Many begomoviruses have a bipartite genome: this means that the genome is segmented into two segments (referred to as DNA A and DNA B) that are packaged into separate particles. Both segments are generally required for successful symptomatic infection in a host cell but DNA B is dependent for its replication upon DNA A, which can in some begomoviruses apparently cause normal infections on its own.

The DNA A segment typically encodes five to six proteins including replication protein Rep, coat protein and transport and/or regulatory proteins. This component is homologous to the genomes of all other geminiviruses. The proteins encoded on it are required for replication (Rep), control of gene expression, overcoming host defenses, encapsidation (coat protein) and insect transmission. The DNA B segment encodes two different movement proteins. These proteins have functions in intra- and intercellular movement in host plants.

The A and B components share little sequence identity with the exception of a ~200 nucleotide sequence with typically >85% identity known as the common region. This region includes an absolutely conserved (among geminiviruses) hairpin structure and repeated sequences (known as 'iterons') that are the recognition sequences for binding of the replication protein (Rep). Within this loop there is a nonanucleotide sequence (TAATATTAC) that acts as the origin (ori) of virion strand DNA replication.

Component exchange (pseudorecombination) occurs in this genus. The usual mechanism of pseudorecombination is by a process known as 'regulon grafting': the A component donates its common region by recombination to the B component being captured. This results in a new dependent interaction between two components.

The proteins in this genus may lie either on the sense strand (positive orientation) or its complement (negative orientation).

Genes
Segment A
V1 (R1)—positive orientation: Coat protein—29.7 kiloDaltons (kDa)
V2—positive orientation: Movement protein (precoat ORF)—12.8 kDa
C1 (L1)—negative orientation: Replication initiation protein (Rep)—40.2 kDa
C2: (L2)—negative orientation: Transcription activator protein (TrAP)—19.6 kDa
C3: (L3)—negative orientation: Replication enhancer—15.6 kDa
C4:—negative orientation: May determine symptom expression—12.0 kDa
Segment B
V1 (R1)—positive orientation: Nuclear shuttle protein—33.1 kDa
C1 (L1)—negative orientation: Movement protein—29.6 kDa

Virology
Smaller than unit length virus components—deletion mutants—are common in infections. These are known as defective interfering (di) DNAs due to their capacity to interfere with virus infection. They reduce virus DNA levels and symptom severity.

Phylogenetics
The two components of the genome have very distinct molecular evolutionary histories and likely to be under very different evolutionary pressures. The DNA B genome originated as a satellite that was captured by the monopartite progenitor of all extant bipartite begomoviruses and has subsequently evolved to become an essential genome component.

More than 133 begomovirus species having monopartite genomes are known: all originate from the Old World. No monopartite begomoviruses native to the New World have yet been identified.

Phylogenetic analysis is based on the A component. B components may be exchanged between species and may result in new species.

Analysis of the genus reveals a number of clades. The main division is between the Old and New World strains. The Old World strains can be divided into African, Indian, Japanese and other Asian clades with a small number of strains grouping outside these. The New World strains divide into Central and Southern America strains.

Along with these main groupings are a number of smaller clades. One group infecting a range of legumes originating from India and Southeast Asia (informally 'Legumovirus') and a set of viruses isolated from Ipomoea species originating from America, Asia and Europe (informally 'Sweepovirus') appear to be basal to all the other species. Two species isolated from Corchorus from Vietnam (informally 'Corchovirus') somewhat unexpectedly group with the New World species.

Transmission

The virus is obligately transmitted by an insect vector, which can be the whitefly Bemisia tabaci or can be other whiteflies.  This vector allows rapid and efficient propagation of the virus because it is an indiscriminate feeder. The vector transmits in a persistent, circulative, non-propagative manner.

This USDA document describes a 5-year plan starting in 1992 to mitigate whiteflies.

Diseases
Several begomoviruses cause severe diseases all over the world. Those begomovirus species infecting tomato such as Tomato yellow leaf curl virus (TYLCV) and Tomato yellow mosaic virus (ToYMV), first identified in the late 1980s, cause significant economic losses worldwide. In countries where these viruses have become widespread such as Trinidad, the Dominican Republic, Mexico and much of Central America, Israel, as well as across Southeast Asia including Thailand, Cambodia, Indonesia, and India, these diseases in tomato and other crops including pepper, and eggplant, can cause an estimated yield loss of 50–60%. Begomoviruses infecting pepper (Capsicum spp.) such as Pepper leaf curl virus and Chilli leaf curl virus also cause significant losses worldwide. Disease is typically manifested in the infected plant as chlorosis, leaf distortion, flower bud absicion and crinkling and stunting. In countries where these viruses have become widespread across Southeast Asia including Thailand, Cambodia, Indonesia, Sri Lanka, and India, these diseases in pepper and other crops including tomato, cucumber, pumpkin, melon, and eggplant, can cause an estimated yield loss of 40–70%.  Bean golden yellow mosaic virus (BGYMV) causes a serious disease in bean species within Central America, the Caribbean and southern Florida.

Species

Abutilon golden mosaic virus
Abutilon mosaic Bolivia virus
Abutilon mosaic Brazil virus
Abutilon mosaic virus
African cassava mosaic Burkina Faso virus
African cassava mosaic virus
Ageratum enation virus
Ageratum leaf curl Sichuan virus
Ageratum leaf curl virus
Ageratum yellow vein Hualian virus
Ageratum yellow vein Sri Lanka virus
Ageratum yellow vein virus
Allamanda leaf curl virus
Allamanda leaf mottle distortion virus
Alternanthera yellow vein virus
Andrographis yellow vein leaf curl virus
Asystasia mosaic Madagascar virus
Bean bushy stunt virus
Bean calico mosaic virus
Bean chlorosis virus
Bean dwarf mosaic virus
Bean golden mosaic virus
Bean golden yellow mosaic virus
Bean latent virus
Bean leaf crumple virus
Bean white chlorosis mosaic virus
Bean yellow mosaic Mexico virus
Bhendi yellow vein Bhubhaneswar virus
Bhendi yellow vein Haryana virus
Bhendi yellow vein mosaic Delhi virus
Bhendi yellow vein mosaic virus
Bitter gourd yellow mosaic virus
Blainvillea yellow spot virus
Blechum interveinal chlorosis virus
Blechum yellow vein virus
Boerhavia yellow spot virus
Cabbage leaf curl Jamaica virus
Cabbage leaf curl virus
Capraria yellow spot virus
Cassava mosaic Madagascar virus
Catharanthus yellow mosaic virus
Centrosema yellow spot virus
Chayote yellow mosaic virus
Chenopodium leaf curl virus
Chilli leaf curl Ahmedabad virus
Chilli leaf curl Bhavanisagar virus
Chilli leaf curl Gonda virus
Chilli leaf curl India virus
Chilli leaf curl Kanpur virus
Chilli leaf curl Sri Lanka virus
Chilli leaf curl Vellanad virus
Chilli leaf curl virus
Chino del tomate Amazonas virus
Chino del tomate virus
Cleome golden mosaic virus
Cleome leaf crumple virus
Clerodendron golden mosaic virus
Clerodendron yellow mosaic virus
Clerodendrum golden mosaic China virus
Clerodendrum golden mosaic Jiangsu virus
Cnidoscolus mosaic leaf deformation virus
Coccinia mosaic Tamil Nadu virus
Common bean mottle virus
Common bean severe mosaic virus
Corchorus golden mosaic virus
Corchorus yellow spot virus
Corchorus yellow vein Cuba virus
Corchorus yellow vein mosaic virus
Corchorus yellow vein virus
Cotton chlorotic spot virus
Cotton leaf crumple virus
Cotton leaf curl Alabad virus
Cotton leaf curl Bangalore virus
Cotton leaf curl Barasat virus
Cotton leaf curl Gezira virus
Cotton leaf curl Kokhran virus
Cotton leaf curl Multan virus
Cotton yellow mosaic virus
Cowpea bright yellow mosaic virus
Cowpea golden mosaic virus
Crassocephalum yellow vein virus
Croton golden mosaic virus
Croton yellow vein mosaic virus
Cucumber chlorotic leaf virus
Cucurbit leaf crumple virus
Dalechampia chlorotic mosaic virus
Datura leaf curl virus
Datura leaf distortion virus
Deinbollia mosaic virus
Desmodium leaf distortion virus
Desmodium mottle virus
Dicliptera yellow mottle Cuba virus
Dicliptera yellow mottle virus
Dolichos yellow mosaic virus
Duranta leaf curl virus
East African cassava mosaic Cameroon virus
East African cassava mosaic Kenya virus
East African cassava mosaic Malawi virus
East African cassava mosaic virus
East African cassava mosaic Zanzibar virus
Eclipta yellow vein virus
Emilia yellow vein Fujian virus
Emilia yellow vein Thailand virus
Emilia yellow vein virus
Erectites yellow mosaic virus
Eupatorium yellow vein mosaic virus
Eupatorium yellow vein virus
Euphorbia leaf curl Guangxi virus
Euphorbia leaf curl virus
Euphorbia mosaic Peru virus
Euphorbia mosaic virus
Euphorbia yellow leaf curl virus
Euphorbia yellow mosaic virus
French bean leaf curl virus
Hedyotis uncinella yellow mosaic virus
Hemidesmus yellow mosaic virus
Hibiscus golden mosaic virus
Hibiscus yellow vein leaf curl virus
Hollyhock leaf curl virus
Hollyhock yellow vein mosaic virus
Hollyhock yellow vein virus
Honeysuckle yellow vein virus
Horsegram yellow mosaic virus
Hybanthus yellow mosaic virus
Indian cassava mosaic virus
Jacquemontia mosaic Yucatan virus
Jacquemontia yellow mosaic virus
Jacquemontia yellow vein virus
Jatropha leaf curl Gujarat virus
Jatropha leaf curl virus
Jatropha leaf yellow mosaic virus
Jatropha mosaic India virus
Jatropha mosaic Nigeria virus
Jatropha mosaic virus
Jatropha yellow mosaic virus
Kudzu mosaic virus
Leonurus mosaic virus
Lindernia anagallis yellow vein virus
Lisianthus enation leaf curl virus
Ludwigia yellow vein Vietnam virus
Ludwigia yellow vein virus
Luffa yellow mosaic virus
Lycianthes yellow mosaic virus
Macroptilium bright mosaic virus
Macroptilium common mosaic virus
Macroptilium golden mosaic virus
Macroptilium mosaic Puerto Rico virus
Macroptilium yellow mosaic Florida virus
Macroptilium yellow mosaic virus
Macroptilium yellow spot virus
Macroptilium yellow vein virus
Malvastrum bright yellow mosaic virus
Malvastrum leaf curl Philippines virus
Malvastrum leaf curl virus
Malvastrum yellow mosaic Helshire virus
Malvastrum yellow mosaic Jamaica virus
Malvastrum yellow mosaic virus
Malvastrum yellow vein Cambodia virus
Malvastrum yellow vein Honghe virus
Malvastrum yellow vein Lahore virus
Malvastrum yellow vein virus
Malvastrum yellow vein Yunnan virus
Melochia mosaic virus
Melochia yellow mosaic virus
Melon chlorotic leaf curl virus
Melon chlorotic mosaic virus
Melon yellow mosaic virus
Merremia mosaic Puerto Rico virus
Merremia mosaic virus
Mesta yellow vein mosaic Bahraich virus
Mimosa yellow leaf curl virus
Mirabilis leaf curl virus
Mungbean yellow mosaic India virus
Mungbean yellow mosaic virus
Ocimum golden mosaic virus
Ocimum mosaic virus
Ocimum yellow vein virus
Okra enation leaf curl virus
Okra leaf curl Oman virus
Okra mottle virus
Okra yellow crinkle virus
Okra yellow mosaic Mexico virus
Oxalis yellow vein virus
Papaya leaf crumple virus
Papaya leaf curl China virus
Papaya leaf curl Guandong virus
Papaya leaf curl virus
Papaya severe leaf curl virus 1
Papaya severe leaf curl virus 2
Papaya yellow leaf curl virus
Passionfruit leaf curl virus
Passionfruit leaf distortion virus
Passionfruit severe leaf distortion virus
Pavonia mosaic virus
Pavonia yellow mosaic virus
Pea leaf distortion virus
Pedilanthus leaf curl virus
Pepper blistering leaf virus
Pepper golden mosaic virus
Pepper huasteco yellow vein virus
Pepper leaf curl Bangladesh virus
Pepper leaf curl Lahore virus
Pepper leaf curl virus
Pepper leaf curl Yunnan virus
Pepper leafroll virus
Pepper yellow leaf curl Aceh virus
Pepper yellow leaf curl Indonesia virus
Pepper yellow leaf curl Indonesia virus 2
Pepper yellow leaf curl Thailand virus
Pepper yellow leaf curl virus
Pepper yellow vein Mali virus
Polygala garcinii virus
Potato yellow mosaic Panama virus
Potato yellow mosaic virus
Pouzolzia golden mosaic virus
Pouzolzia mosaic Guangdong virus
Pouzolzia yellow mosaic virus
Premna leaf curl virus
Pumpkin yellow mosaic virus
Ramie mosaic Yunnan virus
Rhynchosia golden mosaic Havana virus
Rhynchosia golden mosaic Sinaloa virus
Rhynchosia golden mosaic virus
Rhynchosia mild mosaic virus
Rhynchosia rugose golden mosaic virus
Rhynchosia yellow mosaic India virus
Rhynchosia yellow mosaic virus
Rose leaf curl virus
Sauropus leaf curl virus
Senecio yellow mosaic virus
Senna leaf curl virus
Sida angular mosaic virus
Sida bright yellow mosaic virus
Sida chlorotic leaf virus
Sida chlorotic mottle virus
Sida chlorotic vein virus
Sida ciliaris golden mosaic virus
Sida common mosaic virus
Sida golden mosaic Braco virus
Sida golden mosaic Brazil virus
Sida golden mosaic Buckup virus
Sida golden mosaic Costa Rica virus
Sida golden mosaic Florida virus
Sida golden mosaic Lara virus
Sida golden mosaic virus
Sida golden mottle virus
Sida golden yellow spot virus
Sida golden yellow vein virus
Sida interveinal bright yellow virus
Sida leaf curl virus
Sida micrantha mosaic virus
Sida mosaic Alagoas virus
Sida mosaic Bolivia virus 1
Sida mosaic Bolivia virus 2
Sida mosaic Sinaloa virus
Sida mottle Alagoas virus
Sida mottle virus
Sida yellow blotch virus
Sida yellow golden mosaic virus
Sida yellow leaf curl virus
Sida yellow mosaic Alagoas virus
Sida yellow mosaic China virus
Sida yellow mosaic virus
Sida yellow mosaic Yucatan virus
Sida yellow mottle virus
Sida yellow net virus
Sida yellow vein Vietnam virus
Sida yellow vein virus
Sidastrum golden leaf spot virus
Siegesbeckia yellow vein Guangxi virus
Siegesbeckia yellow vein virus
Solanum mosaic Bolivia virus
South African cassava mosaic virus
Soybean blistering mosaic virus
Soybean chlorotic blotch virus
Soybean mild mottle virus
Spilanthes yellow vein virus
Spinach yellow vein virus
Squash leaf curl China virus
Squash leaf curl Philippines virus
Squash leaf curl virus
Squash leaf curl Yunnan virus
Squash mild leaf curl virus
Sri Lankan cassava mosaic virus
Stachytarpheta leaf curl virus
Sunn hemp leaf distortion virus
Sweet potato golden vein Korea virus
Sweet potato leaf curl Canary virus
Sweet potato leaf curl China virus
Sweet potato leaf curl Georgia virus
Sweet potato leaf curl Guangxi virus
Sweet potato leaf curl Henan virus
Sweet potato leaf curl Hubei virus
Sweet potato leaf curl Sao Paulo virus
Sweet potato leaf curl Shandong virus
Sweet potato leaf curl Sichuan virus 1
Sweet potato leaf curl Sichuan virus 2
Sweet potato leaf curl South Carolina virus
Sweet potato leaf curl virus
Sweet potato mosaic virus
Synedrella yellow vein clearing virus
Telfairia golden mosaic virus
Tobacco curly shoot virus
Tobacco leaf curl Comoros virus
Tobacco leaf curl Cuba virus
Tobacco leaf curl Dominican Republic virus
Tobacco leaf curl Pusa virus
Tobacco leaf curl Thailand virus
Tobacco leaf curl Yunnan virus
Tobacco leaf curl Zimbabwe virus
Tobacco leaf rugose virus
Tobacco mottle leaf curl virus
Tobacco yellow crinkle virus
Tomato bright yellow mosaic virus
Tomato bright yellow mottle virus
Tomato chino La Paz virus
Tomato chlorotic leaf curl virus
Tomato chlorotic leaf distortion virus
Tomato chlorotic mottle Guyane virus
Tomato chlorotic mottle virus
Tomato common mosaic virus
Tomato curly stunt virus
Tomato dwarf leaf virus
Tomato enation leaf curl virus
Tomato golden leaf distortion virus
Tomato golden leaf spot virus
Tomato golden mosaic virus
Tomato golden mottle virus
Tomato golden vein virus
Tomato interveinal chlorosis virus
Tomato latent virus
Tomato leaf curl Anjouan virus
Tomato leaf curl Arusha virus
Tomato leaf curl Bangalore virus
Tomato leaf curl Bangladesh virus
Tomato leaf curl Burkina Faso virus
Tomato leaf curl Cebu virus
Tomato leaf curl China virus
Tomato leaf curl Comoros virus
Tomato leaf curl Diana virus
Tomato leaf curl Ghana virus
Tomato leaf curl Guangdong virus
Tomato leaf curl Guangxi virus
Tomato leaf curl Gujarat virus
Tomato leaf curl Hainan virus
Tomato leaf curl Hanoi virus
Tomato leaf curl Hsinchu virus
Tomato leaf curl Iran virus
Tomato leaf curl Japan virus
Tomato leaf curl Java virus
Tomato leaf curl Joydebpur virus
Tomato leaf curl Karnataka virus
Tomato leaf curl Karnataka virus 2
Tomato leaf curl Karnataka virus 3
Tomato leaf curl Kerala virus
Tomato leaf curl Kunene virus
Tomato leaf curl Laos virus
Tomato leaf curl Liwa virus
Tomato leaf curl Madagascar virus
Tomato leaf curl Mahe virus
Tomato leaf curl Malaysia virus
Tomato leaf curl Mali virus
Tomato leaf curl Mindanao virus
Tomato leaf curl Moheli virus
Tomato leaf curl Namakely virus
Tomato leaf curl New Delhi virus
Tomato leaf curl New Delhi virus 2
Tomato leaf curl New Delhi virus 4
Tomato leaf curl New Delhi virus 5
Tomato leaf curl Nigeria virus
Tomato leaf curl Palampur virus
Tomato leaf curl Patna virus
Tomato leaf curl Philippines virus
Tomato leaf curl Pune virus
Tomato leaf curl purple vein virus
Tomato leaf curl Rajasthan virus
Tomato leaf curl Seychelles virus
Tomato leaf curl Sinaloa virus
Tomato leaf curl Sri Lanka virus
Tomato leaf curl Sudan virus
Tomato leaf curl Sulawesi virus
Tomato leaf curl Taiwan virus
Tomato leaf curl Tanzania virus
Tomato leaf curl Toliara virus
Tomato leaf curl Uganda virus
Tomato leaf curl Vietnam virus
Tomato leaf curl virus
Tomato leaf deformation virus
Tomato leaf distortion virus
Tomato mild mosaic virus
Tomato mild yellow leaf curl Aragua virus
Tomato mosaic Havana virus
Tomato mosaic severe dwarf virus
Tomato mottle leaf curl virus
Tomato mottle Taino virus
Tomato mottle virus
Tomato mottle wrinkle virus
Tomato rugose mosaic virus
Tomato rugose yellow leaf curl virus
Tomato severe leaf curl Kalakada virus
Tomato severe leaf curl virus
Tomato severe rugose virus
Tomato twisted leaf virus
Tomato vein clearing leaf deformation virus
Tomato wrinkled mosaic virus
Tomato yellow leaf curl Axarquia virus
Tomato yellow leaf curl China virus
Tomato yellow leaf curl Guangdong virus
Tomato yellow leaf curl Indonesia virus
Tomato yellow leaf curl Kanchanaburi virus
Tomato yellow leaf curl Malaga virus
Tomato yellow leaf curl Mali virus
Tomato yellow leaf curl Sardinia virus
Tomato yellow leaf curl Shuangbai virus
Tomato yellow leaf curl Thailand virus
Tomato yellow leaf curl Vietnam virus
Tomato yellow leaf curl virus
Tomato yellow leaf curl Yunnan virus
Tomato yellow leaf deformation dwarf virus
Tomato yellow leaf distortion virus
Tomato yellow margin leaf curl virus
Tomato yellow mottle virus
Tomato yellow spot virus
Tomato yellow vein streak virus
Triumfetta yellow mosaic virus
Velvet bean golden mosaic virus
Velvet bean severe mosaic virus
Verbena mottle virus
Vernonia crinkle virus
Vernonia yellow vein Fujian virus
Vernonia yellow vein virus
Vigna yellow mosaic virus
Vinca leaf curl virus
Watermelon chlorotic stunt virus
West African Asystasia virus 1
West African Asystasia virus 2
West African Asystasia virus 3
Whitefly-associated begomovirus 1
Whitefly-associated begomovirus 2
Whitefly-associated begomovirus 3
Whitefly-associated begomovirus 4
Whitefly-associated begomovirus 6
Whitefly-associated begomovirus 7
Wissadula golden mosaic virus
Wissadula yellow mosaic virus

References

Further reading

External links

 Notes on Genus: Begomovirus
 Fact sheet: TYLCV
 MicrobiologyBytes: Plant Viruses
 Proposed Strategies for Begomovirus Disease Management in Tomato in Trinidad
 Bean golden yellow mosaic virus
 ViralZone: Begomovirus

 
Viral plant pathogens and diseases
Virus genera